The Betrayal of Christ may refer to:

 The Betrayal of Christ (van Dyck, Madrid)
 The Betrayal of Christ (van Dyck, Bristol)
 The Betrayal of Christ (van Dyck, Minneapolis)